Tarn Taran Junction (station code: TTO) is a railway station located in Tarn Taran district in the Indian state of Punjab and serves Tarn Taran Sahib city. Tarn Taran station falls under Firozpur railway division of Northern Railway zone of Indian Railways.

The railway station 
This station is located on the single track,  broad gauge, Amritsar–Khemkaran line. It is also terminal station on Beas–Tarn Taran line. It is well connected to a number of major cities via Amritsar and Beas railway stations.

Electrification 
Tarn Taran  Junction railway station tracks are electrified.

Amenities 
Tarn Taran railway station has booking window and all basic amenities like drinking water, public toilets, sheltered area with adequate seating. There is one platform at the station.

References

External links 

 Pictures of Tarn Taran Junction railway station

Firozpur railway division
Railway stations in Tarn Taran district